Dinkel is a surname. Notable people with the surname include:

Emmy Dinkel-Keet (1908–2003), Dutch artist
Nicholas Dinkel (1874–1919), American football player
Tom Dinkel (born 1956), American football player
William Francis Melchert-Dinkel (born 1962), American nurse